Joani Tremblay (born in 1984) is a painter living and working in Montreal, Quebec. Tremblay has exhibited internationally at venues including Harper’s, New York and Los Angeles; Marie-Laure Fleisch Gallery, Brussels; The Pit, Glendale, CA; Projet Pangée, Montreal; 3331 Arts Chiyoda, Tokyo; and others. Joani Tremblay investigates the perception of place through oil painting. Tremblay paints from a constructed idea of place assembling images from a variety of sources, including advertisements, social media, and field research. The artist utilizes digital collage techniques, then paints the composition onto canvas, ultimately creating an image that oscillates between figuration and abstraction.

Biography 
Tremblay received her Bachelor in Visual Arts from Université du Québec à Montréal in 2012  and an MFA from Concordia University in 2017. Tremblay was the co-founder and former co-director of Projet Pangée, an artist-run gallery in Montreal. Tremblay's works are featured in various public collections, including the RBC Art Collection,  the Montreal City Art Collection, and the Mint Museum.

Residencies and awards 

 International Studio & Curatorial Program artist-in-residence, 2021, 2022
 Canada Council for the Arts: Explore and Create Research and Creation, grant recipient, 2017, 2022
 The New York Art Residency and Studios (NARS) Foundation, artist-in-residence, 2020
 The Elizabeth Greenshields Foundation grant recipient, 2018, 2020
 RBC Canadian Painting Competition shortlisted, 2017, 2018
 Residency Eastside International (ESXLA), artist-in-residence, 2018
 Master Research Fellowship Recipient, The Fonds de recherche du Québec - Société et culture, 2014-2016
 Residency 3331 Arts Chiyoda, Tokyo, artist-in-residence, 2014

Publications 

 Sorenson, Oli. "The Afterlife’s Painting" Issue (Re)seeing Painting, Esse arts + opinions Magazine, Spring/Summer, 2021.
 Campbell, James D., "Joani Tremblay" Border Crossings Magazine, November, 2020.
 ArtMaze Magazine, Issue 20, 2020.
 Quirion, Jean-Michel. “(In)temporalité au consulat” Vie des arts, 2020.
 Delgado, Jérôme. “Ne rien produire, sinon des expos” Le Devoir, 2020.
 Letarte, Marie-Anne, “Joani Tremblay”, L’Inconvénient magazine, No. 78, 2019.
 Maake Magazine, Issue 9 curated by Hein Koh, 2019.
 Hedstierna, Snövit. “Matta formsqråk i ansqråk”, Cap&Design, Sweden, #2, 2017.

References

External links 
 Official website
 Harper's Gallery

1984 births
Living people
Artists from Montreal
Canadian women painters
Concordia University alumni
Université du Québec à Montréal alumni
Canadian contemporary artists
21st-century Canadian painters
21st-century Canadian women artists